The Caproni Ca.225 was a twin-engine attack bomber design proposed by Caproni in the mid-1930s.

Specifications

See also

References

Ca.225
Low-wing aircraft
Twin-engined tractor aircraft
Aircraft first flown in 1935